Qanat Kuchek may refer to:
 Qanat Kuchek-e Aqsi
 Qanat Kuchek-e Olya